James Allen McCune (born June 18, 1990) is an American actor and musician, best known for his roles on The Walking Dead, Shameless, Blair Witch, and his work with Sugar Pine 7.

Life and career
He was born in Atlanta, Georgia, to Charlotte and Loren McCune. He started acting at 15 thanks to his high school's drama club "Echostage," where he performed in many plays and musicals. After high school, James Allen McCune played "Roger" in Fabrefaction Theatre's regional production of Rent in 2010 before starting work in film and television.

His most notable performances are as Jimmy in AMC's hit show The Walking Dead, Matty Baker on Shameless and James in the 2016 Blair Witch film.

He was a guest on Episode 43 of The Official Podcast and is also Executive Executive Producer of The Gus & Eddy Podcast, on which he is a frequent guest.

Filmography

Film
2013: Snitch — Craig 
2013: Congratulations! — Graduate/Edward
2013: Only in L.A. — Jamie
2013: Pauline in a Beautiful World — Doug
2016: Blair Witch — James Donahue

Television
2011: Hail Mary — Thorton Tate 
2011: Homeland — Jeff (1 episode)
2011–2012: The Walking Dead — Jimmy (recurring role; 10 episodes)
2013: The Anna Nicole Story — Tommy Smith (TV film)
2013: Gentlemen Callers — Alex
2014–2015: Shameless — Matty Baker

Web series
2017–2019: Sugar Pine 7 — James Allen McCune/Himself
2017: The Official Podcast — James Allen McCune
2018: The Gus & Eddy Podcast — James Allen McCune
2018: The Gus & Eddy Podcast — Why Would You Boil Peanuts?
2019: The Gus & Eddy Podcast — Theme Park SpongeBob Has Muscular Legs
2019: The Official Podcast — With James Allen McCune
2019: Grey Area — (Ongoing video series by James Allen McCune)
2019: Funhaus — (Fowl Play - Untitled Goose Game Funny Moments)
2020: Funhaus — (The War On Drums - Dealer Simulator Gameplay)
2020: Funhaus — (Are You Smarter Than a YouTuber? - Demo Disk Gameplay)

Video game
2019: Days Gone — Wade Taylor

References

External links
 

Male actors from Atlanta
Living people
1990 births
21st-century American male actors
Male actors from Los Angeles